Sunghursh is a 1968 Indian Hindi film directed and produced by Harnam Singh Rawail. It is based on a short story Layli Asmaner Ayna in Bengali language by Jnanpith Award-winning writer Mahasweta Devi, which presents a fictionalised account of vendetta within a thuggee cult in the holy Indian town of Varanasi. It stars Dilip Kumar, Vyjayanthimala, Balraj Sahni, Sanjeev Kumar, Jayant, Deven Verma, Durga Khote and Iftekhar. The film was the last one to see Dilip Kumar and Vyjayanthimala working together. Sunghursh was an "Average" grosser at box-office and was the tenth highest grossing film of the year.

The music is by Naushad and lyrics for the songs are by Shakeel Badayuni. Naushad and Badayuni had worked together on many films previously and were "the most sought after" composer-lyricist duo of the time in Bollywood. Sunghursh was popularly mistaken to be a debut film of Sanjeev Kumar. 

The director Harnam Singh Rawail's son Rahul Rawail, who is also a director, paid a tribute to this film by titling one of his as Jeevan Ek Sanghursh (1990) starring Anil Kapoor and Madhuri Dixit.

Plot
Bhavani Prasad is a powerful Shakta priest at Kashi. Prasad, a devotee of the black goddess Kali and a thuggee, religiously follows a practice to murder wealthy travelers who stay in his pilgrim guesthouse and offers them as a sacrifice to Kali. Prasad's son Shankar does not agree to such practices, opposes his father and decides to leave the village with his wife and their three children: Kundan, Yashoda and Gopal. Prasad forcibly takes Kundan with him to follow in his footsteps and forbids him from seeing the rest of the family.

Young Kundan is now being raised by his grandfather Prasad, who desires to have Kundan as his successor, head of a temple and pilgrim guesthouse on the banks of the Ganges river. Prasad mysteriously kills his son and puts the blame on his enemy and nephew, Naubatlal. Prasad had earlier killed Naubatlal's father. When Naubatlal learns the truth, he decides to take revenge, but Prasad kills Naubatlal before he could do anything. Naubatlal's family decides to leave the village and settle down Calcutta where his two young sons, Dwarka (Sanjeev Kumar) and Ganeshi Prasad, work as merchants. They learn about their father's death from their mother (Mumtaz Begum) and swear to avenge their father's death by killing Prasad and his grandson Kundan (Dilip Kumar).

Kundan continues to serve Prasad in the Banaras temple, but does not follow the practice of killing people. When he is invited to his younger sister, Yashodha's marriage, Kundan gets a chance to visit his mother and grandmother and his siblings after many years. One day, Kundan meets Laila-E-Aasmaan, a courtesan, in the temple who has come from Calcutta after her madam's death. Kundan falls in love with Laila only to realise that she was his childhood friend, Munni. Kundan proposes to Laila, but Prasad does not agree to the marriage, knowing that Laila was hired by Dwarka and Ganesh Prasad to seduce Kundan and bring him to them.

Kundan decides to end the feud with Dwarka, but Dwarka does not co-operate. Dwarka attacks Kundan, but gets killed by him. As repentance for his grandfather's sins, Kundan decides to serve Ganeshi and takes another identity, that of Bajrangi to make peace with him, only to realise that Ganeshi Prasad is in love with Laila and wants to marry her as his second wife.

Cast
 Dilip Kumar as Kundan Prasad / Bajrangi
 Vyjayanthimala as Munni / Laila-E-Aasmaan
 Balraj Sahni as Ganeshi Prasad
 Sanjeev Kumar as Dwarka Prasad
 Jayant as Bhavani Prasad
 Durga Khote as Bhavani Prasad's Wife
 Anju Mahendru as Yashoda Prasad
 Sunder as Kundan's Uncle
 Ulhas as Bhim
 Deven Verma as Nisar
 Padma Khanna as Mama's Wife
 Sulochana Latkar as Shankar's Wife
 Iftekhar as Shankar Prasad
 Urmila Bhatt as Kunti Prasad
 Padma Rani as Dwarka's wife
 D. K. Sapru as Naubatlal Prasad
 Ram Mohan as Ishwarlal 
 Lata Sinha as Lata
 Jagdish Raj as Raja Sahib
 Mumtaz Begum as Naubatlal's Wife
 Mehmood Junior as Dwarka's Son
 Dilip Dhawan as Young Kundan

Production
Director Rawail had considered Sadhana to play the lead actress of the film. He had waited for months to sign her in his Mere Mehboob (1963). But now the actress had developed thyroid problems and took a break from acting for treatment in Boston. Eventually, Rawail signed Vyjayanthimala for the role. Dilip Kumar and Vyjayanthimala who had worked together for Naya Daur (1957) were then said to have a romantic affair. The actors parted after Vyjayanthimala worked with Raj Kapoor in the 1964 Hindi film Sangam. Thus, most of the scenes between the two actors for Sungharsh were shot separately.

When the film was near completion, it was rumoured that with the increasing conflicts between the two leading actors, Vyjayanthimala would be replaced by another actress, Waheeda Rehman. Rehman had already replaced Vyjayanthimala in another Hindi film starring Kumar, Ram Aur Shyam, (1967) which was being shot simultaneously with Sunghursh. Vyjayanthimala readily declined the claim of her leaving the film when it was about to finish its shooting. Sungharsh was the last film where Kumar and Vyjayanthimala worked together. By then, both the actors had done the maximum number of films together and each was a commercial success.

Sanjeev Kumar, who had previously acted in theatre and other smaller film productions, was noticed through his performance of negative role through Sungharsh and he then shot to fame. He was commended for his role while a newcomer as compared with established actors like Dilip Kumar and Balraj Sahni. The film was popularly mistaken to be his debut.

As Sungharsh was set in Varanasi during the 19th century, Rawail took special care about the costumes and sets to create the look for the period. The actor-director Rajesh Roshan had worked as an assistant director on the film.

Soundtrack
The music for all the songs was composed by Naushad and the lyrics were written by Shakeel Badayuni. Naushad and Badayuni had worked together on many films previously and were "the most sought after" composer-lyricist duo of the time in Bollywood. Their collaborations of Baiju Bawra (1952), Mother India (1957), Mughal-E-Azam (1960) and more are quite popular. They had worked with Rawail and had given the musical hit Mere Mehboob in 1963. The film's soundtrack has seven songs sung by Mohammad Rafi and Lata Mangeshkar with one song sung by Asha Bhosle. All are solo songs where Naushad used the music from the regions of Awadh and eastern Uttar Pradesh. But critics have considered these compositions "below par" as compared with Naushad's other work.

Similar to his earlier work where Naushad had simplified Hindustani classical music to produce filmi songs, the solo "Mere Paas Aao Nazar To Milao" rendered by Lata Mangeshkar was based on Bhairavi Raga. The song "Mere Pairon Mein Ghunghroo" by Rafi was included in "101 Mohammad Rafi Hits by Shemaroo Entertainment on his 31st death anniversary. The singer died on 31 July 1980. The song was also used by former Chief Ministers of Bihar Lalu Prasad Yadav during the election campaign for 2010 Bihar Legislative Assembly election.

Awards
At the 16th Filmfare Awards, Dilip Kumar was nominated for the Best Actor for Sunghursh as well as for Aadmi. However, the award was presented to Shammi Kapoor for his performance in Brahmachari. Kumar received the Bengal Film Journalists' Association Awards for Best Actor in Hindi. The film won four more awards in various categories at 32nd Annual BFJA Awards.

References

External links
 

1968 films
Indian crime films
1960s Hindi-language films
Varanasi
Films about cults
Films set in Uttar Pradesh
Films based on short fiction
Films directed by H. S. Rawail
1968 crime films
Hindi-language crime films
Films based on works by Mahasweta Devi